Scott Robert McGregor (born December 19, 1986) is an American professional baseball starting pitcher who is currently a free agent. Though he has yet to reach the Major League Baseball (MLB), he has played at Triple-A—the level directly below the majors—each year since 2013, he appeared in MLB spring training.

Career
He was born in Cincinnati and attended Lakota East High School in Liberty Township, Ohio. He went to the University of Memphis following high school, where he posted a won-loss record of 13–15 in three years there.

McGregor was taken in the 15th round of the 2008 MLB draft, a couple picks after outfielder Joey Butler, by the St. Louis Cardinals. He was 4–0 with a 1.45 ERA and five walks allowed in 37.1 innings his first professional season and followed that with a 7–11 record and a 5.56 ERA in 34 games (17 starts) for the Quad Cities River Bandits in 2009. In 115 innings, he allowed 26 walks and had the eighth-best BB/9 IP ratio in the Midwest League among pitchers with 100 or more innings pitched. In 2010, he was 10-8 with a 3.14 ERA in 31 games (20 starts) split between two teams; in 137.2 innings, he allowed 22 walks. Baseball America ranked him as having the best control in the Cardinals system. After missing 2011 to Tommy John surgery, McGregor returned in 2012 to go 5–2 with a 6.31 ERA in 14 games (13 starts). He reached Triple-A for the first time in 2013, going 6–10 with a 4.83 ERA in 18 games (17 starts) for the Memphis Redbirds; He also pitched for the Springfield Cardinals that year and went 10–11 with a 4.06 ERA as a whole. He began 2014 with Memphis, but was released in June. The Nationals signed him and he played for their Double-A team, the Harrisburg Senators, and their Triple-A club, the Chiefs. Between the three teams, McGregor was 4–9 with a 5.56 ERA. In 2015, he was 6–6 with a 4.04 ERA in 27 games (15 starts) for Syracuse. McGregor was released on March 16, 2016.

On April 11, 2016, he signed with the Somerset Patriots of the Atlantic League of Professional Baseball.

On June 16, 2016, he signed with the Nexen Heroes of the KBO League.

In May 2017, McGregor signed with the Fubon Guardians of the Chinese Professional Baseball League. After sustaining a leg injury in June and pitching to a 4.88 ERA in 24 innings of work, he was released on August 5, 2017.

International career
He played for the United States national baseball team in the 2015 Pan American Games.

References

External links
, or CPBL

1986 births
Living people
American expatriate baseball players in South Korea
American expatriate baseball players in Taiwan
Baseball players at the 2015 Pan American Games
Cardenales de Lara players
American expatriate baseball players in Venezuela
Fubon Guardians players
Gulf Coast Cardinals players
Harrisburg Senators players
Johnson City Cardinals players
Kiwoom Heroes players
KBO League pitchers
Memphis Redbirds players
Memphis Tigers baseball players
Palm Beach Cardinals players
Pan American Games medalists in baseball
Pan American Games silver medalists for the United States
Quad Cities River Bandits players
Somerset Patriots players
Baseball players from Cincinnati
Springfield Cardinals players
Syracuse Chiefs players
United States national baseball team players
Medalists at the 2015 Pan American Games